Blackburne may refer to:

Blackburne (name)
Blackburne (motorcycles), a British motorcycle manufacturer 1913–1921
Blackburne Airport, an airport in Montserrat
Blackburne, Edmonton, a neighbourhood in Edmonton, Canada

See also
Blackburn (disambiguation)
Italian Game, Blackburne Shilling Gambit, a chess opening